Siha Sukarno (born 1923) is an Indonesian fencer. He competed in the individual sabre and épée events at the 1956 Summer Olympics.

References

External links
 

1923 births
Possibly living people
Indonesian male épée fencers
Olympic fencers of Indonesia
Fencers at the 1956 Summer Olympics
Indonesian male sabre fencers
20th-century Indonesian people